Daniel Nestor and Nenad Zimonjić were the defending champions, but chose not to participate together. Nestor played alongside Leander Paes, but lost in the second round to Pablo Cuevas and David Marrero. Zimonjić teamed up with Marcin Matkowski, but lost in the second round to Jamie Murray and John Peers.
Cuevas and Marrero went on to win the title, defeating Marcel Granollers and Marc López in the final, 6–4, 7–5.

Seeds
All seeds receive a bye into the second round.

Draw

Finals

Top half

Bottom half

References
 Main Draw

Italian Open - Doubles
Men's Doubles